Ron Brown is a retired senior Australian public servant. He was Secretary of the Department of Immigration, Local Government and Ethnic Affairs between 1987 and 1990 under the Hawke Government.

Career
Ron Brown was the State Director of Social Security in the Northern Territory, Tasmania, South Australia and New South Wales between 1977 and 1985, and then Executive Director at the Special Broadcasting Service (SBS) between 1985 and 1987.

In May 1987, Brown was appointed Secretary of the Department of Immigration and Ethnic Affairs (later Department of Immigration, Local Government and Ethnic Affairs).

Brown left the Australian Public Service shortly after the 1990 federal election, thought to have been sacked by Prime Minister Bob Hawke, perhaps due to his not being sufficiently responsive to certain ethnic communities, or perhaps as an effort to remove Brown's Deputy Secretary, Tony Harris.

References

Living people
Year of birth missing (living people)
Secretaries of the Australian Government Immigration Department
Board members of the Special Broadcasting Service